Italian literature is written in the Italian language, particularly within Italy. It may also refer to literature written by Italians or in other languages spoken in Italy, often languages that are closely related to modern Italian, including regional varieties and vernacular dialects. Italian literature begins in the 12th century, when in different regions of the peninsula the Italian vernacular started to be used in a literary manner. The Ritmo laurenziano is the first extant document of Italian literature.

An early example of Italian literature is the tradition of vernacular lyric poetry performed in Occitan, which reached Italy by the end of the 12th century. In 1230, the Sicilian School became notable for being the first style in standard Italian. Dante Alighieri, one of the greatest of Italian poets, is notable for being the author of La Divina Commedia (The Divine Comedy,  1308–1320). Renaissance humanism developed during the 14th and the beginning of the 15th centuries; Italian humanists sought to create a citizenry able to speak and write with eloquence and clarity. Early Italian humanists, such as the lyric poet Francesco Petrarca and the Neoplatonist philosopher Marsilio Ficino, were erudite Classical scholars and great collectors of antique manuscripts. The Italian nobleman, statesman, and mecenate Lorenzo de Medici is regarded as the standard bearer of the influence of Florence on the Renaissance in the Italian states. The Italian polymath, scientist, and artist Leonardo da Vinci wrote a treatise on painting. The development of the drama in the 15th century was very great. In the 16th century, the fundamental characteristic of the era following the end of the Renaissance is that it perfected the Italian character of its language. Niccolò Machiavelli and Francesco Guicciardini were the chief originators of the science of history. Pietro Bembo was an influential figure in the development of the Italian language and an influence on the 16th-century revival of interest in the works of Petrarca.

In 1690, the Academy of Arcadia was instituted with the goal of "restoring" literature by imitating the simplicity of the ancient shepherds with sonnets, madrigals, canzonette, and blank verses. In the 17th century, some strong and independent Italian free-thinkers, such as Bernardino Telesio, Giulio Cesare Vanini, Giordano Bruno, and Tommaso Campanella turned philosophical and esoteric inquiry into fresh channels, and opened the way for the scientific conquests of the Italian astronomer Galileo Galilei, who is notable both for his scientific discoveries and his writings. In the 18th century, the political condition of the Italian states began to improve, and philosophers disseminated their writings and ideas throughout Europe during the Age of Enlightenment. Apostolo Zeno and Metastasio are two of the notable figures of the age. Carlo Goldoni, a Venetian playwright and librettist, created the comedy of character. The leading figure of the 18th-century Italian literary revival was Giuseppe Parini.
 
The philosophical, political, and socially progressive ideas behind the French Revolution of 1789 gave a special direction to Italian literature in the second half of the 18th century, inaugurated with the publication of the juridical-philosophical treatise Dei delitti e delle pene (On Crimes and Punishments, 1764) by the Italian criminologist and jurist Cesare Beccaria. Love of liberty and desire for equality created a literature aimed at national object. Patriotism and classicism were the two principles that inspired the literature that began with the Italian dramatist and poet Vittorio Alfieri. Other patriots included the lyric poets Vincenzo Monti and Ugo Foscolo. The Romantic movement had as its organ the Conciliatore, established in 1818 at Milan. The main instigator of the reform was the Italian poet and novelist Alessandro Manzoni, notable for being the author of the historical novel I promessi sposi (The Betrothed, 1827–1842). The great Italian poet of the age was Giacomo Leopardi. History returned to its spirit of learned research. The literary movement that preceded and was contemporary with the political revolutions of 1848 may be said to be represented by four writers: Giuseppe Giusti, Francesco Domenico Guerrazzi, Vincenzo Gioberti, and Cesare Balbo. After the Risorgimento, political literature became less important. The first part of this period is characterized by two divergent trends of literature that both opposed Romanticism: the Scapigliatura and Verismo, with the most prominent figure of the latter being the Sicilian writer Giovanni Verga, author of I Malavoglia (The House by the Medlar-Tree, 1881).

Important early 20th-century Italian writers include Giovanni Pascoli, Italo Svevo, Gabriele D'Annunzio, Umberto Saba, Giuseppe Ungaretti, Eugenio Montale, and Luigi Pirandello (winner of the 1934 Nobel Prize in Literature). Neorealism was developed by Alberto Moravia. Pier Paolo Pasolini became notable for being one of the most controversial authors in the history of Italy. Umberto Eco became internationally successful with the Medieval detective story Il nome della rosa (The Name of the Rose, 1980). The Nobel Prize in Literature has been awarded to Italian language authors six times (as of 2019) with winners including Giosuè Carducci, Grazia Deledda, Luigi Pirandello, Salvatore Quasimodo, Eugenio Montale, and Dario Fo.

Early medieval Latin literature

As the Western Roman Empire declined, the Latin tradition was kept alive by writers such as Cassiodorus, Boethius, and Symmachus. The liberal arts flourished at Ravenna under Theodoric, and the Gothic kings surrounded themselves with masters of rhetoric and of grammar. Some lay schools remained in Italy, and noted scholars included Magnus Felix Ennodius, Arator, Venantius Fortunatus, Felix the Grammarian, Peter of Pisa, Paulinus of Aquileia, and many others.

Italians who were interested in theology gravitated towards Paris. Those who remained were typically attracted by the study of Roman law. This furthered the later establishment of the medieval universities of Bologna, Padua, Vicenza, Naples, Salerno, Modena and Parma. These helped to spread culture, and prepared the ground in which the new vernacular literature developed. Classical traditions did not disappear, and affection for the memory of Rome, a preoccupation with politics, and a preference for practice over theory combined to influence the development of Italian literature.

High medieval literature

Trovatori
The earliest vernacular literary tradition in Italy was in Occitan, a language spoken in parts of northwest Italy. A tradition of vernacular lyric poetry arose in Poitou in the early 12th century and spread south and east, eventually reaching Italy by the end of the 12th century. The first troubadours (trovatori in Italian), as these Occitan lyric poets were called, to practise in Italy were from elsewhere, but the high aristocracy of the Northern Italy was ready to patronise them. It was not long before native Italians adopted Occitan as a vehicle for poetic expression, though the term Occitan did not really appear until the year 1300, "langue d'oc" or "provenzale" being the preferred expressions.

Among the early patrons of foreign troubadours were especially the House of Este, the Da Romano, House of Savoy, and the Malaspina. Azzo VI of Este entertained the troubadours Aimeric de Belenoi, Aimeric de Peguilhan, Albertet de Sestaro, and Peire Raimon de Tolosa from Occitania and Rambertino Buvalelli from Bologna, one of the earliest Italian troubadours. The influence of these poets on the native Italians got the attention of Aimeric de Peguilhan in 1220. Then at the Malaspina court, he penned a poem attacking a quintet of Occitan poets at the court of Manfred III of Saluzzo: Peire Guilhem de Luserna, Perceval Doria, Nicoletto da Torino, Chantarel, and Trufarel. Aimeric apparently feared the rise of native competitors.

The margraves of Montferrat—Boniface I, William VI, and Boniface II—were patrons of Occitan poetry. Peire de la Mula stayed at the Montferrat court around 1200 and Raimbaut de Vaqueiras spent most of his career as court poet and close friend of Boniface I. Raimbaut, along with several other troubadours, including Elias Cairel, followed Boniface on the Fourth Crusade and established, however briefly, Italo-Occitan literature in Thessalonica.

Azzo VI's daughter, Beatrice, was an object of the early poets "courtly love". Azzo's son, Azzo VII, hosted Elias Cairel and Arnaut Catalan. Rambertino was named podestà of Genoa between in 1218 and it was probably during his three-year tenure there that he introduced Occitan lyric poetry to the city, which later developed a flourishing Occitan literary culture.

Among the Genoese troubadours were Lanfranc Cigala, a judge; Calega Panzan, a merchant; Jacme Grils, also a judge; and Bonifaci Calvo, a knight. Genoa was also the place of genesis of the podestà-troubadour phenomenon: men who served in several cities as podestàs on behalf of either the Guelph or Ghibelline party and who wrote political poetry in Occitan. Rambertino Buvalelli was the first podestà-troubadour and in Genoa there were the Guelphs Luca Grimaldi and Luchetto Gattilusio and the Ghibellines Perceval and Simon Doria.

The Occitan tradition in Italy was more broad than simply Genoa or even Lombardy. Bertolome Zorzi was from Venice. Girardo Cavallazzi was a Ghibelline from Novara. Nicoletto da Torino was probably from Turin. In Ferrara the Duecento was represented by Ferrari Trogni. Terramagnino da Pisa, from Pisa, wrote the Doctrina de cort as a manual of courtly love. He was one of the late 13th-century figures who wrote in both Occitan and Italian. Paolo Lanfranchi da Pistoia, from Pistoia, was another. Both wrote sonnets, but while Terramagnino was a critic of the Tuscan school, Paolo has been alleged as a member. On the other hand, he has much in common with the Sicilians and the Dolce Stil Novo.

Perhaps the most important aspect of the Italian troubadour phenomenon was the production of chansonniers and the composition of vidas and razos. Uc de Saint Circ, who was associated with the Da Romano and Malaspina families, spent the last forty years of his life in Italy. He undertook to author the entire razo corpus and a great many of the vidas. The most famous and influential Italian troubadour, Sordello (1220s–1230s), however, was from the small town of Goito near Mantua.

The troubadours had a connexion with the rise of a school of poetry in the Kingdom of Sicily. In 1220 Obs de Biguli was present as a "singer" at the coronation of the Emperor Frederick II, already King of Sicily. Guillem Augier Novella before 1230 and Guilhem Figueira thereafter were important Occitan poets at Frederick's court. Both had fled the Albigensian Crusade, like Aimeric de Peguilhan. The Crusade had devastated Languedoc and forced many troubadours of the area, whose poetry had not always been kind to the Church hierarchy, to flee to Italy, where an Italian tradition of papal criticism was begun. Protected by the emperor and the Ghibelline faction criticism of the Church establishment flourished.

Chivalric romance

The Historia de excidio Trojae, attributed to Dares Phrygius, claimed to be an eyewitness account of the Trojan war. It provided inspiration for writers in other countries such as Benoît de Sainte-Maure, Herbort von Fritzlar, and Konrad von Würzburg. While Benoît wrote in French, he took his material from a Latin history. Herbort and Konrad used a French source to make an almost original work in their own language. Guido delle Colonne of Messina, one of the vernacular poets of the Sicilian school, composed the Historia destructionis Troiae. In his poetry Guido was an imitator of the Provençals, but in this book he converted Benoît's French romance into what sounded like serious Latin history.

Much the same thing occurred with other great legends. Qualichino of Arezzo wrote couplets about the legend of Alexander the Great. Europe was full of the legend of King Arthur, but the Italians contented themselves with translating and abridging French romances. Jacobus de Voragine, while collecting his Golden Legend (1260), remained a historian. The intellectual life of Italy showed itself in an altogether special, positive, almost scientific form in the study of Roman law. Farfa, Marsicano, and other scholars translated Aristotle, the precepts of the school of Salerno, and the travels of Marco Polo, linking the classics and the Renaissance.

At the same time, epic poetry was written in a mixed language, a dialect of Italian based on French: hybrid words exhibited a treatment of sounds according to the rules of both languages, had French roots with Italian endings, and were pronounced according to Italian or Latin rules. In short, the language of the epic poetry belonged to both tongues. Examples include the chansons de geste, Macaire, the Entre en Espagne written by Niccola of Padua, the Prise de Pampelune, and others. All this preceded the appearance of a purely Italian literature.

The emergence of native vernacular literature

The French and Occitan languages gradually gave way to the native Italian. Hybridism recurred, but it no longer predominated. In the Bovo d'Antona and the Rainaldo e Lesengrino, Venetian is clearly felt, although the language is influenced by French forms. These writings, which Graziadio Isaia Ascoli has called miste (mixed), immediately preceded the appearance of purely Italian works.

There is evidence that a kind of literature already existed before the 13th century: The Ritmo cassinese, Ritmo di Sant'Alessio, Laudes creaturarum, Ritmo lucchese, Ritmo laurenziano, Ritmo bellunese are classified by Cesare Segre, et al. as "Archaic Works" (Componimenti Arcaici): "such are labeled the first literary works in the Italian vernacular, their dates ranging from the last decades of the 12th century to the early decades of the 13th". However, as he points out, such early literature does not yet present any uniform stylistic or linguistic traits.

This early development, however, was simultaneous in the whole peninsula, varying only in the subject matter of the art. In the north, the poems of Giacomino da Verona and Bonvesin da la Riva were specially religious, and were intended to be recited to the people. They were written in a dialect of Lombard and Venetian. They may be considered as belonging to the "popular" kind of poetry, taking the word, however, in a broad sense. This sort of composition may have been encouraged by the old custom in the north of Italy of listening in the piazzas and on the highways to the songs of the jongleurs. The crowds were delighted with the stories of romances, the wickedness of Macaire, and the misfortunes of Blanziflor, the terrors of the Babilonia Infernale and the blessedness of the Gerusalemme celeste, and the singers of religious poetry vied with those of the chansons de geste.

Sicilian School

The year 1230 marked the beginning of the Sicilian School and of a literature showing more uniform traits. Its importance lies more in the language (the creation of the first standard Italian) than its subject, a love-song partly modeled on the Provençal poetry imported to the south by the Normans and the Svevs under Frederick II. This poetry differs from the French equivalent in its treatment of the woman, less erotic and more platonic, a vein further developed by Dolce Stil Novo in later 13th-century Bologna and Florence. The customary repertoire of chivalry terms is adapted to Italian phonotactics, creating new Italian vocabulary. The French suffixes -ière and -ce generated hundreds of new Italian words in -iera and -za (for example, riv-iera and costan-za). These were adopted by Dante and his contemporaries, and handed on to future generations of Italian writers.

To the Sicilian school belonged Enzio, king of Sardinia, Pietro della Vigna, Inghilfredi, Guido and Odo delle Colonne, Jacopo d'Aquino, Ruggieri Apugliese, Giacomo da Lentini, Arrigo Testa, and others. Most famous is Io m'aggio posto in core (I have stated within my heart), by Giacomo da Lentini, the head of the movement, but there is also poetry written by Frederick himself. Giacomo da Lentini is also credited with inventing the sonnet, a form later perfected by Dante, Petrarch and Boccaccio. The censorship imposed by Frederick meant that no political matter entered literary debate. In this respect, the poetry of the north, still divided into communes or city-states with relatively democratic governments, provided new ideas. These new ideas are shown in the Sirventese genre, and later, Dante's Commedia, full of invectives against contemporary political leaders and popes.

Though the conventional love-song prevailed at Frederick's (and later Manfred's) court, more spontaneous poetry existed in the Contrasto attributed to Cielo d'Alcamo. This contrasto (dispute) between two lovers in the Sicilian language is not the most ancient or the only southern poem of a popular kind. It belongs without doubt to the time of the emperor Frederick II (no later than 1250), and is important as proof that there existed a popular, independent of literary, poetry. The Contrasto is probably a scholarly re-elaboration of a lost popular rhyme and is the closest to a kind of poetry that perished or was smothered by the ancient Sicilian literature. Its distinguishing point was its possession of all qualities opposite to the poetry of the rhymers of the "Sicilian School", though its style may betray a knowledge of Frederick's poetry, and there is probably a satiric intent in the mind of the anonymous poet. It is vigorous in the expression of feelings. The conceits, sometimes bold and very coarse, show that its subject matter is popular. Everything about the Contrasto is original.

The poems of the Sicilian school were written in the first known standard Italian. This was elaborated by these poets under the direction of Frederick II and combines many traits typical of the Sicilian, and to a lesser, but not negligible extent, Apulian dialects and other southern dialects, with many words of Latin and French origin. Dante's styles illustre, cardinale, aulico, curiale were developed from his linguistic study of the Sicilian School, whose technical features had been imported by Guittone d'Arezzo in Tuscany, though he did introduce political issues, in his ″canzoniere". The standard changed slightly in Tuscany, because Tuscan scriveners perceived the five-vowel system used by southern Italian as a seven-vowel one. As a consequence, the texts that Italian students read in their anthology contain lines that appears to not rhyme with each other (sometimes Sic. -i > -e, -u > -o), a feature known as ″Sicilian rhyme" (rima siciliana) which was widely used later by poets such as Dante or Petrarch as a display of technical skill or as a last resort.

Religious literature

In the 13th century a religious movement took place in Italy, with the rise of the Dominican and Franciscan Orders. The earliest preserved sermons in an Italian language are from Jordan of Pisa, a Dominican. Francis of Assisi, mystic and reformer in the Catholic Church, the founder of the Franciscans, also wrote poetry. Though he was educated, Francis's poetry was beneath the refined poetry at the center of Frederick's court. According to legend, Francis dictated the hymn Cantico del Sole in the eighteenth year of his penance, almost rapt in ecstasy. It was the first great poetical work of Northern Italy, written in a kind of verse marked by assonance, a poetic device more widespread in Northern Europe. Other poems previously attributed to Francis are now generally recognized as lacking in authenticity.

Jacopone da Todi was a poet who represented the religious feeling that had made special progress in Umbria. Jacopone was possessed by St. Francis's mysticism, but was also a satirist who mocked the corruption and hypocrisy of the Church personified by Pope Boniface VIII, persecutor of Jacopone and Dante. Jacopone's wife died after the stands at a public tournament collapsed, and the sorrow at her sudden death caused Jacopone to sell all he possessed and give it to the poor. Jacopone covered himself with rags, joined St. Francis's Third Order, took pleasure in being laughed at, and was followed by a crowd of people who mocked him and called after him Jacopone, Jacopone. He went on raving for years, subjecting himself to the severest sufferings, and giving vent to his religious intoxication in his poems. Jacopone was a mystic, who from his hermit's cell looked out into the world and specially watched the papacy, scourging with his words Pope Celestine V and Pope Boniface VIII, for which he was imprisoned.

The religious movement in Umbria was followed by another literary phenomenon, the religious drama. In 1258 a hermit, Raniero Fasani, left the cavern where he had lived for many years and suddenly appeared at Perugia. Fasani represented himself as sent by God to disclose mysterious visions, and to announce to the world terrible visitations. This was a turbulent period of  political faction (the Guelphs and Ghibellines), interdicts and excommunications issued by the popes, and reprisals of the imperial party. In this environment, Fasani's pronouncements stimulated the formation of the Compagnie di Disciplinanti, who, for a penance, scourged themselves until they drew blood, and sang Laudi in dialogue in their confraternities. These laudi, closely connected with the liturgy, were the first example of the drama in the vernacular tongue of Italy. They were written in the Umbrian dialect, in verses of eight syllables, and, according to the 1911 Encyclopædia Britannica, "have not any artistic value." Their development, however, was rapid. As early as the end of the 13th century the Devozioni del Giovedi e Venerdi Santo appeared, mixing liturgy and drama. Later, di un Monaco che andò al servizio di Dio ("of a monk who entered the service of God") approached the definite form the religious drama would assume in the following centuries.

First Tuscan literature
13th-century Tuscany was in a unique situation. The Tuscans spoke a dialect that closely resembled Latin and afterward became, almost exclusively, the language of literature, and which was already regarded at the end of the 13th century as surpassing other dialects.  ("The Tuscan tongue is better suited to the letter or literature") wrote Antonio da Tempo of Padua, born about 1275. After the fall of the Hohenstaufen at the Battle of Benevento in 1266, it was the first province of Italy. From 1266, Florence began a political reform movement that led, in 1282, to the appointment of the Priori delle Arti, and establishment of the Arti Minori. This was later copied by Siena (with the Magistrato dei Nove), by Lucca, by Pistoia, and by other Guelph cities in Tuscany with similar popular institutions. The guilds took the government into their hands, and it was a time of social and political prosperity.

In Tuscany, too, popular love poetry existed. A school of imitators of the Sicilians was led by Dante da Majano, but its literary originality took another line — that of humorous and satirical poetry. The entirely democratic form of government created a style of poetry that stood strongly against the medieval mystic and chivalrous style. Devout invocation of God or of a lady came from the cloister and the castle; in the streets of the cities everything that had gone before was treated with ridicule or biting sarcasm. Folgore da San Gimignano laughs when in his sonnets he tells a party of Sienese youths the occupations of every month in the year, or when he teaches a party of Florentine lads the pleasures of every day in the week. Cenne della Chitarra laughs when he parodies Folgore's sonnets. The sonnets of Rustico di Filippo are half-fun and half-satire, as is the work of Cecco Angiolieri of Siena, the oldest humorist we know, a far-off precursor of Rabelais and Montaigne.

Another kind of poetry also began in Tuscany. Guittone d'Arezzo made art quit chivalry and Provençal forms for national motives and Latin forms. He attempted political poetry, and, although his work is often obscure, he prepared the way for the Bolognese school. Bologna was the city of science, and philosophical poetry appeared there. Guido Guinizelli was the poet after the new fashion of the art. In his work the ideas of chivalry are changed and enlarged. Only those whose heart is pure can be blessed with true love, regardless of class. He refuted the traditional credo of courtly love, for which love is a subtle philosophy only a few chosen knights and princesses could grasp. Love is blind to blasons but not to a good heart when it finds one: when it succeeds it is the result of the spiritual, not physical affinity between two souls. Guinizzelli's democratic view can be better understood in the light of the greater equality and freedom enjoyed by the city-states of the center-north and the rise of a middle class eager to legitimise itself in the eyes of the old nobility, still regarded with respect and admiration but in fact dispossessed of its political power. Guinizelli's Canzoni make up the bible of Dolce Stil Novo, and one in particular, "Al cor gentil" ("To a Kind Heart") is considered the manifesto of the new movement that bloomed in Florence under Cavalcanti, Dante, and their followers. His poetry has some of the faults of the school of d'Arezzo. Nevertheless, he marks a great development in the history of Italian art, especially because of his close connection with Dante's lyric poetry.

In the 13th century, there were several major allegorical poems. One of these is by Brunetto Latini, who was a close friend of Dante. His Tesoretto is a short poem, in seven-syllable verses, rhyming in couplets, in which the author is lost in a wilderness and meets a lady, who represents Nature and gives him much instruction. We see here vision, allegory, and instruction with a moral object—three elements we find again in the Divine Comedy. Francesco da Barberino, a learned lawyer who was secretary to bishops, a judge, and a notary, wrote two little allegorical poems, the Documenti d'amore and Del reggimento e dei costumi delle donne. The poems today are generally studied not as literature, but for historical context. A fourth allegorical work was the Intelligenza, which is sometimes attributed to Compagni, but is probably only a translation of French poems.

In the 15th century, humanist and publisher Aldus Manutius published Tuscan poets Petrarch and Dante Alighieri (The Divine Comedy), creating the model for what became a standard for modern Italian.

Development of early prose

Italian prose of the 13th century was as abundant and varied as its poetry. The earliest example dates from 1231, and consists of short notices of entries and expenses by Mattasala di Spinello dei Lambertini of Siena. At this time, there was no sign of literary prose in Italian, though there was in French. Halfway through the century, a certain Aldobrando or Aldobrandino, from either Florence or Siena, wrote a book for Beatrice of Savoy, countess of Provence, called Le Régime du corps. In 1267 Martino da Canale wrote a history of Venice in the same Old French (langue d'oïl). Rustichello da Pisa, who was for a long while at the court of Edward I of England, composed many chivalrous romances, derived from the Arthurian cycle, and subsequently wrote the Travels of Marco Polo, which may have been dictated by Polo himself. And finally Brunetto Latini wrote his Tesoro in French. Latini also wrote some works in Italian prose such as La rettorica, an adaptation from Cicero's De inventione, and translated three orations from Cicero: Pro Ligario, Pro Marcello and Pro rege Deiotaro. Another important writer was the Florentine judge Bono Giamboni, who translated Orosius's Historiae adversus paganos, Vegetius's Epitoma rei militaris, made a translation/adaptation of Cicero's De inventione mixed with the Rethorica ad Erennium, and a translation/adaptation of Innocent III's De miseria humane conditionis. He also wrote an allegorical novel called Libro de' Vizi e delle Virtudi whose earlier version (Trattato delle virtù e dei vizi) is also preserved. Andrea of Grosseto, in 1268, translated three Treaties of Albertanus of Brescia, from Latin to Tuscan dialect.

After the original compositions in the langue d'oïl came translations or adaptations from the same. There are some moral narratives taken from religious legends, a romance of Julius Caesar, some short histories of ancient knights, the Tavola rotonda, translations of the Viaggi of Marco Polo, and of Latini's Tesoro. At the same time, translations from Latin of moral and ascetic works, histories, and treatises on rhetoric and oratory appeared. Also noteworthy is Composizione del mondo, a scientific book by Ristoro d'Arezzo, who lived about the middle of the 13th century. This work is a copious treatise on astronomy and geography. Ristoro was a careful observer of natural phenomena; many of the things he relates were the result of his personal investigations, and consequently his works are more reliable than those of other writers of the time on similar subjects.

Another short treatise exists: De regimine rectoris, by Fra Paolino, a Minorite friar of Venice, who was bishop of Pozzuoli, and who also wrote a Latin chronicle. His treatise stands in close relation to that of Egidio Colonna, De regimine principum. It is written in Venetian.

The 13th century was very rich in tales. A collection called the Cento Novelle antiche contains stories drawn from many sources, including Asian, Greek and Trojan traditions, ancient and medieval history, the legends of Brittany, Provence and Italy, the Bible, local Italian traditions, and histories of animals and old mythology. This book has a distant resemblance to the Spanish collection known as El Conde Lucanor. The peculiarity of the Italian book is that the stories are very short, and seem to be mere outlines to be filled in by the narrator as he goes along. Other prose novels were inserted by Francesco da Barberino in his work Del reggimento e dei costumi delle donne, but they are of much less importance.

On the whole the Italian novels of the 13th century have little originality, and are a faint reflection of the very rich legendary literature of France. Some attention should be paid to the Lettere of Fra Guittone d'Arezzo, who wrote many poems and also some letters in prose, the subjects of which are moral and religious. Guittone's love of antiquity and the traditions of Rome and its language was so strong that he tried to write Italian in a Latin style. The letters are obscure, involved and altogether barbarous. Guittone took as his special model Seneca the Younger, Aristotle, Cicero, Boethius and Augustine of Hippo. Guittone viewed his style as very artistic, but later scholars view it as extravagant and grotesque.

Dolce Stil Novo

With the school of Lapo Gianni, Guido Cavalcanti, Cino da Pistoia and Dante Alighieri, lyric poetry became exclusively Tuscan. The whole novelty and poetic power of this school, consisted in, according to Dante, Quando Amore spira, noto, ed a quel niodo Ch'ei detta dentro, vo significando: that is, in a power of expressing the feelings of the soul in the way in which love inspires them, in an appropriate and graceful manner, fitting form to matter, and by art fusing one with the other. Love is a divine gift that redeems man in the eyes of God, and the poet's mistress is the angel sent from heaven to show the way to salvation. This a neo-platonic approach widely endorsed by Dolce Stil Novo, and although in Cavalcanti's case it can be upsetting and even destructive, it is nonetheless a metaphysical experience able to lift man onto a higher, spiritual dimension. Gianni's new style was still influenced by the Siculo-Provençal school.

Cavalcanti's poems fall into two classes: those that portray the philosopher, (il sottilissimo dialettico, as Lorenzo the Magnificent called him) and those more directly the product of his poetic nature imbued with mysticism and metaphysics. To the first set belongs the famous poem Sulla natura d'amore, which in fact is a treatise on amorous metaphysics, and was annotated later in a learned way by renowned Platonic philosophers of the 15th century, such as Marsilius Ficinus and others. In other poems, Cavalcanti tends to stifle poetic imagery under a dead weight of philosophy. On the other hand, in his Ballate, he pours himself out ingenuously, but with a consciousness of his art. The greatest of these is considered to be the ballata composed by Cavalcanti when he was banished from Florence with the party of the Bianchi in 1300, and took refuge at Sarzana.

The third poet among the followers of the new school was Cino da Pistoia, of the family of the Sinibuldi. His love poems are sweet, mellow and musical.

The 14th century: the roots of Renaissance

Dante

Dante Alighieri, one of the greatest of Italian poets, also shows these lyrical tendencies. In 1293 he wrote La Vita Nuova ("new life" in English, so called to indicate that his first meeting with Beatrice was the beginning of a new life), in which he idealizes love. It is a collection of poems to which Dante added narration and explication. Everything is supersensual, aerial, heavenly, and the real Beatrice is supplanted by an idealized vision of her, losing her human nature and becoming a representation of the divine. Dante is the main character of the work, and the narration purports to be autobiographical, though historical information about Dante's life proves this to be poetic license.

Several of the lyrics of the La Vita Nuova deal with the theme of the new life. Not all the love poems refer to Beatrice, however—other pieces are philosophical and bridge over to the Convivio.

The Divine Comedy

La Divina Commedia tells of the poet's travels through the three realms of the dead—Hell, Purgatory, and Paradise—accompanied by the Latin poet Virgil. An allegorical meaning hides under the literal one of this great epic. Dante, travelling through Hell, Purgatory, and Paradise, symbolizes mankind aiming at the double object of temporal and eternal happiness. The forest where the poet loses himself lost symbolizes sin. The mountain illuminated by the sun is universal monarchy.

The three beasts are the three vices and the three powers that offered the greatest obstacles to Dante's designs. Envy is Florence, light, fickle and divided by the Black Guelphs and the White Guelphs. Pride is the house of France. Avarice is the papal court. Virgil represents reason and the empire. Beatrice is the symbol of the supernatural aid mankind must have to attain the supreme end, which is God.

The merit of the poem does not lie in the allegory, which still connects it with medieval literature. What is new is the individual art of the poet, the classic art transfused for the first time into a Romance form. Whether he describes nature, analyses passions, curses the vices or sings hymns to the virtues, Dante is notable for the grandeur and delicacy of his art. He took the materials for his poem from theology, philosophy, history, and mythology, but especially from his own passions, from hatred and love. Under the pen of the poet, the dead come to life again; they become men again, and speak the language of their time, of their passions. Farinata degli Uberti, Boniface VIII, Count Ugolino, Manfred, Sordello, Hugh Capet, St. Thomas Aquinas, Cacciaguida, St. Benedict, and St. Peter, are all so many objective creations; they stand before us in all the life of their characters, their feelings, and their habits.

The real chastiser of the sins and rewarder of virtues is Dante himself. The personal interest he brings to bear on the historical representation of the three worlds is what most interests us and stirs us. Dante remakes history after his own passions. Thus the Divina Commedia is not only a lifelike drama of contemporary thoughts and feelings, but also a clear and spontaneous reflection of the individual feelings of the poet, from the indignation of the citizen and the exile to the faith of the believer and the ardour of the philosopher. The Divina Commedia ranks among the finest works of world literature.

Petrarch

Two facts characterize the literary life of Petrarch: classical research and the new human feeling introduced into his lyric poetry. The Petrarch who unearthed the works of the great Latin writers helps us understand the Petrarch who loved a real woman, named Laura, and celebrated her in her life and after her death in poems full of studied elegance. Petrarch was the first humanist, and he was at the same time the first modern lyric poet. His career was long and tempestuous. He lived for many years at Avignon, cursing the corruption of the papal court; he travelled through nearly the whole of Europe; he corresponded with emperors and popes, and he was considered the most important writer of his time.

His Canzoniere is divided into three parts: the first containing the poems written during Laura's lifetime, the second the poems written after her death, the third the Trionfi. The one and only subject of these poems is love; but the treatment is full of variety in conception, in imagery and in sentiment, derived from the most varied impressions of nature. Petrarch's lyric verse is quite different, not only from that of the Provençal troubadours and the Italian poets before him, but also from the lyrics of Dante. Petrarch is a psychological poet, who examines all his feelings and renders them with an art of exquisite sweetness. The lyrics of Petrarch are no longer transcendental like Dante's, but keep entirely within human limits. The second part of the Canzoniere is the more passionate. The Trionfi are inferior; in them Petrarch tried to imitate the Divina Commedia, but failed. The Canzoniere includes also a few political poems, one supposed to be addressed to Cola di Rienzi and several sonnets against the court of Avignon. These are remarkable for their vigour of feeling, and also for showing that, compared to Dante, Petrarch had a sense of a broader Italian consciousness. He wooed an Italy that was different from any conceived by the people of the Middle Ages. In this, he was a precursor of modern times and modern aspirations. Petrarch had no decided political idea. He exalted Cola di Rienzi, invoked the emperor Charles IV, and praised the Visconti; in fact, his politics were affected more by impressions than by principles. Above all this was his love of Italy, which in his mind was reunited with Rome, the great city of his heroes, Cicero and Scipio. Petrarca, some say, began the Renaissance humanism.

Boccaccio

Giovanni Boccaccio had the same enthusiastic love of antiquity and the same worship for the new Italian literature as Petrarch. He was the first to put together a Latin translation of the Iliad and, in 1375, the Odyssey. His classical learning was shown in the work De genealogia deorum, in which he enumerates the gods according to genealogical trees from the various authors who wrote about the pagan divinities. The Genealogia deorum is, as A. H. Heeren said, an encyclopaedia of mythological knowledge; and it was the precursor of the humanist movement of the 15th century. Boccaccio was also the first historian of women in his De mulieribus claris, and the first to tell the story of the great unfortunates in his De casibus virorum illustrium. He continued and perfected former geographical investigations in his interesting book De montibus, silvis, fontibus, lacubus, fluminibus, stagnis, et paludibus, et de nominibus maris, for which he made use of Vibius Sequester. Of his Italian works, his lyrics do not come anywhere near to the perfection of Petrarch's. His narrative poetry is better. He did not invent the octave stanza, but was the first to use it in a work of length and artistic merit, his Teseide, the oldest Italian romantic poem. The Filostrato relates the loves of Troiolo and Griseida (Troilus and Cressida). It may be that Boccaccio knew the French poem of the Trojan war by Benoit de Sainte-More; but the interest of his poem lies in the analysis of the passion of love. The Ninfale fiesolano tells the love story of the nymph Mesola and the shepherd Africo. The Amorosa Visione, a poem in triplets, doubtless owed its origin to the Divina Commedia. The Ameto is a mixture of prose and poetry, and is the first Italian pastoral romance.

The Filocopo takes the earliest place among prose romances. In the Filocopo, there is a remarkable exuberance in the mythological part, which damages the romance as an artistic work, but contributes to the history of Boccaccio's mind. The Fiammetta is another romance, about the loves of Boccaccio and Maria d'Aquino, a supposed natural daughter of King Robert, whom he always called by this name of Fiammetta.

Boccaccio became famous principally for the Italian work, Decamerone, a collection of a hundred novels, related by a party of men and women who retired to a villa near Florence to escape the plague in 1348. Novel-writing, so abundant in the preceding centuries, especially in France, now for the first time assumed an artistic shape. The style of Boccaccio tends to the imitation of Latin, but in him prose first took the form of elaborated art. The rudeness of the old fabliaux gives place to the careful and conscientious work of a mind that has a feeling for what is beautiful, that has studied the classic authors, and that strives to imitate them as much as possible. Over and above this, in the Decamerone, Boccaccio is a delineator of character and an observer of passions. In this lies his novelty. Much has been written about the sources of the novels of the Decamerone. Probably Boccaccio made use both of written and of oral sources. Popular tradition must have furnished him with the materials of many stories, as, for example, that of Griselda.

Unlike Petrarch, who was always discontented, preoccupied, wearied with life, disturbed by disappointments, we find Boccaccio calm, serene, satisfied with himself and with his surroundings. Notwithstanding these fundamental differences in their characters, the two great authors were old and warm friends. But their affection for Dante was not equal. Petrarch, who says that he saw him once in his childhood, did not preserve a pleasant recollection of him, and it would be useless to deny that he was jealous of his renown. The Divina Commedia was sent him by Boccaccio, when he was an old man, and he confessed that he never read it. On the other hand, Boccaccio felt for Dante something more than love—enthusiasm. He wrote a biography of him (which some critics deprecate the accuracy of) and gave public critical lectures on the poem in Santa Maria del Fiore at Florence.

Others

Imitators

Fazio degli Uberti and Federico Frezzi were imitators of the Divina Commedia, but only in its external form. The former wrote the Dittamondo, a long poem, in which the author supposes that he was taken by the geographer Solinus into different parts of the world, and that his Commedia guide related the history of them. The legends of the rise of the different Italian cities have some importance historically. Frezzi, bishop of his native town Foligno, wrote the Quadriregio, a poem of the four kingdoms Love, Satan, the Vices, and the Virtues. This poem has many points of resemblance with the Divina Commedia. Frezzi pictures the condition of man who rises from a state of vice to one of virtue, and describes hell, limbo, purgatory and heaven. The poet has Pallas for a companion.

Ser Giovanni Fiorentino wrote, under the title of Pecorone, a collection of tales, which are supposed to have been related by a monk and a nun in the parlour of the monastery Novelists of Forli. He closely imitated Boccaccio, and drew on Villani's chronicle for his historical stories. Franco Sacchetti wrote tales too, for the most part on subjects taken from Florentine history. His book gives a lifelike picture of Florentine society at the end of the 14th century. The subjects are almost always improper, but it is evident that Sacchetti collected these anecdotes so he could draw his own conclusions and moral reflections, which he puts at the end of each story. From this point of view, Sacchetti's work comes near to the Monalisaliones of the Middle Ages. A third novelist was Giovanni Sercambi of Lucca, who after 1374 wrote a book, in imitation of Boccaccio, about a party of people who were supposed to fly from a plague and to go travelling about in different Italian cities, stopping here and there telling stories. Later, but important, names are those of Masuccio Salernitano (Tommaso Guardato), who wrote the Novellino, and Antonio Cornazzano whose Proverbii became extremely popular.

Chronicles

Chronicles formerly believed to have been of the 13th century are now mainly regarded as forgeries. At the end of the 13th century there is a chronicle by Dino Compagni, probably authentic.

Giovanni Villani, born in 1300, was more of a chronicler than an historian. He relates the events up to 1347. The journeys that he made in Italy and France, and the information thus acquired, mean that his chronicle, the Historie Fiorentine, covers events all over Europe. He speaks at length, not only of events in politics and war, but of the stipends of public officials, the sums of money used to pay for soldiers and public festivals, and many other things of which knowledge is valuable. Villani's narrative is often encumbered with fables and errors, particularly when he speaks of things that happened before his time.

Matteo was the brother of Giovanni Villani, and continued the chronicle up to 1363. It was again continued by Filippo Villani.

Ascetics
The Divine Commedia is ascetic in its conception, and in a good many points of its execution. Petrarch's work has similar qualities; yet neither Petrarch nor Dante could be classified among the pure ascetics of their time. But many other writers come under this head. St Catherine of Siena's mysticism was political. This extraordinary woman aspired to bring back the Church of Rome to evangelical virtue, and left a collection of letters written in a high and lofty tone to all kinds of people, including popes. Hers is the clearest religious utterance to have made itself heard in 14th-century Italy. Although precise ideas of reformation did not enter her head, the want of a great moral reform was felt in her heart. She must take her place among those who prepared the way for the religious movement of the 16th century.

Another Sienese, Giovanni Colombini, founder of the order of Jesuati, preached poverty by precept and example, going back to the religious idea of St Francis of Assisi. His letters are among the most remarkable in the category of ascetic works in the 14th century. Bianco da Siena wrote several religiously-inspired poems (lauda) that were popular in the Middle Ages. Jacopo Passavanti, in his Specchio della vera penitenza, attached instruction to narrative. Domenico Cavalca translated from the Latin the Vite de' Santi Padri. Rivalta left behind him many sermons, and Franco Sacchetti (the famous novelist) many discourses. On the whole, there is no doubt that one of the most important productions of the Italian spirit of the 14th century was religious literature.

Popular works
Humorous poetry, largely developed in the 13th century, was carried on in the 14th by Bindo Bonichi, Arrigo di Castruccio, Cecco Nuccoli, Andrea Orgagna, Filippo de Bardi, Adriano de Rossi, Antonio Pucci and other lesser writers. Orgagna was specially comic; Bonichi was comic with a satirical and moral purpose.

Pucci was superior to all of them for the variety of his production. He put into triplets the chronicle of Giovanni Villani (Centiloquio), and wrote many historical poems called Serventesi, many comic poems, and not a few epico-popular compositions on various subjects. A little poem of his in seven cantos treats of the war between the Florentines and the Pisans from 1362 to 1365.

Other poems drawn from a legendary source celebrate the Reina d'Oriente, Apollonio di Tiro, the Bel Gherardino, etc. These poems, meant to be recited, are the ancestors of the romantic epic.

Political works

Many poets of the 14th century produced political works. Fazio degli Uberti, the author of Dittamondo, who wrote a Serventese to the lords and people of Italy, a poem on Rome, and a fierce invective against Charles IV, deserves notice, as do Francesco di Vannozzo, Frate Stoppa and Matteo Frescobaldi. It may be said in general that following the example of Petrarch many writers devoted themselves to patriotic poetry.

From this period also dates that literary phenomenon known under the name of Petrarchism. The Petrarchists, or those who sang of love, imitating Petrarch's manner, were found already in the 14th century. But others treated the same subject with more originality, in a manner that might be called semi-popular. Such were the Ballate of Ser Giovanni Fiorentino, of Franco Sacchetti, of Niccolo Soldanieri, and of Guido and Bindo Donati. Ballate were poems sung to dancing, and we have very many songs for music of the 14th century. We have already stated that Antonio Pucci versified Villani's Chronicle. It is enough to notice a chronicle of Arezzo in terza rima by Gorello de Sinigardi, and the history, also in terza rima, of the journey of Pope Alexander III to Venice, by Pier de Natali. Besides this, every kind of subject, whether history, tragedy or husbandry, was treated in verse. Neri di Landocio wrote a life of St Catherine; Jacopo Gradenigo put the Gospels into triplets.

The 15th century: Renaissance humanism

Renaissance humanism developed during the 14th and the beginning of the 15th centuries, and was a response to the challenge of Mediæval scholastic education, emphasizing practical, pre-professional and -scientific studies. Scholasticism focused on preparing men to be doctors, lawyers or professional theologians, and was taught from approved textbooks in logic, natural philosophy, medicine, law and theology. The main centers of humanism were Florence and Naples.

Rather than train professionals in jargon and strict practice, humanists sought to create a citizenry (including, sometimes, women) able to speak and write with eloquence and clarity. Thus, they would be capable of better engaging the civic life of their communities and persuading others to virtuous and prudent actions. This was to be accomplished through the study of the studia humanitatis, today known as the humanities: grammar, rhetoric, history, poetry and moral philosophy.

Early humanists, such as Petrarch, Coluccio Salutati and Leonardo Bruni, were great collectors of antique manuscripts. Many worked for the organized Church and were in holy orders (like Petrarch), while others were lawyers and chancellors of Italian cities, like Petrarch's disciple, Salutati, the Chancellor of Florence, and thus had access to book copying workshops.

In Italy, the humanist educational program won rapid acceptance and, by the mid-15th century, many of the upper classes had received humanist educations. Some of the highest officials of the Church were humanists with the resources to amass important libraries. Such was Cardinal Basilios Bessarion, a convert to the Latin Church from Greek Orthodoxy, who was considered for the papacy and was one of the most learned scholars of his time. There were five 15th-century Humanist Popes, one of whom, Aeneas Silvius Piccolomini (Pius II), was a prolific author and wrote a treatise on "The Education of Boys".

Literature in the Florence of the Medici

Leone Battista Alberti, the learned Greek and Latin scholar, wrote in the vernacular, and Vespasiano da Bisticci, while he was constantly absorbed in Greek and Latin manuscripts, wrote the Vite di uomini illustri, valuable for their historical contents, and rivalling the best works of the 14th century in their candour and simplicity. Andrea da Barberino wrote the beautiful prose of the Reali di Francia, giving a coloring of romanità to the chivalrous romances. Belcari and Girolamo Benivieni returned to the mystic idealism of earlier times.

But it is in Cosimo de' Medici and Lorenzo de Medici, from 1430 to 1492, that the influence of Florence on the Renaissance is particularly seen. The mind of Lorenzo de Medici was formed by the ancients: he attended the class of the Greek John Argyropulos, sat at Platonic banquets, took pains to collect codices, sculptures, vases, pictures, gems and drawings to ornament the gardens of San Marco and to form the library, the Laurentian Library. In the saloons of his Florentine palace, in his villas at Careggi, Fiesole and Anibra, stood the wonderful chests painted by Dello di Niccolò Delli with stories from Ovid, the Hercules of Pollaiuolo, the Pallas of Botticelli, the works of Filippino and Verrocchio. De Medici lived entirely in the classical world; and yet if we read his poems we only see the man of his time, the admirer of Dante and of the old Tuscan poets, who takes inspiration from the popular muse, and who succeeds in giving to his poetry the colors of the most pronounced realism as well as of the loftiest idealism, who passes from the Platonic sonnet to the impassioned triplets of the Amori di Venere, from the grandiosity of the Salve to Nencia and to Beoni, from the Canto carnascialesco to the lauda. The feeling of nature is strong in him; at one time sweet and melancholy, at another vigorous and deep, as if an echo of the feelings, the sorrows, the ambitions of that deeply agitated life. He liked to look into his own heart with a severe eye, but he was also able to pour himself out with tumultuous fulness. He described with the art of a sculptor; he satirized, laughed, prayed, sighed, always elegant, always a Florentine, but a Florentine who read Anacreon, Ovid and Tibullus, who wished to enjoy life, but also to taste of the refinements of art.

Next to Lorenzo comes Poliziano, who also united, and with greater art, the ancient and the modern, the popular and the classical style. In his Rispetti and in his Ballate the freshness of imagery and the plasticity of form are inimitable. A great Greek scholar, Poliziano wrote Italian verses with dazzling colors; the purest elegance of the Greek sources pervaded his art in all its varieties, in the Orfeo as well as the Stanze per la giostra.

A completely new style of poetry arose, the Canto carnascialesco. These were a kind of choral songs, which were accompanied with symbolic masquerades, common in Florence at the carnival. They were written in a metre like that of the ballate; and for the most part they were put into the mouth of a party of workmen and tradesmen, who, with not very chaste allusions, sang the praises of their art. These triumphs and masquerades were directed by Lorenzo himself. In the evening, there set out into the city large companies on horseback, playing and singing these songs. There are some by Lorenzo himself, which surpass all the others in their mastery of art. That entitled Bacco ed Arianna is the most famous.

Epic: Pulci and Boiardo

Italy did not yet have true epic poetry, but had, however, many poems called cantari, because they contained stories that were sung to the people, and besides there were romantic poems, such as the Buovo d'Antona, the Regina Ancroja and others. But the first to introduce life into this style was Luigi Pulci, who grew up in the house of the Medici, and who wrote the Morgante Maggiore at the request of Lucrezia Tornabuoni, mother of Lorenzo de' Medici. The material of the Morgante is almost completely taken from an obscure chivalrous poem of the 15th century, rediscovered by Pio Rajna. Pulci erected a structure of his own, often turning the subject into ridicule, burlesquing the characters, introducing many digressions, now capricious, now scientific, now theological. Pulci raised the romantic epic into a work of art, and united the serious and the comic.

With a more serious intention Matteo Boiardo, count of Scandiano, wrote his Orlando innamorato, in which he seems to have aspired to embrace the whole range of Carolingian legends; but he did not complete his task. We find here too a large vein of humour and burlesque. Still Boiardo was drawn to the world of romance by a profound sympathy for chivalrous manners and feelings; that is to say, for love, courtesy, valour and generosity. A third romantic poem of the 15th century was the Mambriano by Francesco Bello (Cieco of Ferrara). He drew from the Carolingian cycle, from the romances of the Round Table, and from classical antiquity. He was a poet of no common genius, and of ready imagination. He showed the influence of Boiardo.

Other

History had neither many nor very good students in the 15th century. Its revival belonged to the following age. It was mostly written in Latin. Gioviano Pontano wrote the history of Naples, Leonardo Bruni of Arezzo that of Florence, in Latin. Bernardino Corio wrote the history of Milan in Italian.

Leonardo da Vinci wrote a treatise on painting, Leone Battista Alberti one on sculpture and architecture. But the names of these two men are important, not so much as authors of these treatises, but as being embodiments of another characteristic of the age of the Renaissance; versatility of genius, power of application along many and varied lines, and of being excellent in all. Leonardo was an architect, a poet, a painter, an hydraulic engineer and a distinguished mathematician. Alberti was a musician, studied jurisprudence, was an architect and a draughtsman, and had great fame in literature. He had a deep feeling for nature, and an almost unique faculty of assimilating all that he saw and heard. Leonardo and Alberti are representatives and almost a compendium in themselves of all that intellectual vigour of the Renaissance age.

Piero Capponi, author of the Commentari deli acquisto di Pisa and of the narration of the Tumulto dei Ciompi, belonged to both the 14th and the 15th centuries. Albertino Mussato of Padua wrote in Latin a history of Emperor Henry VII. He then produced a Latin tragedy on Ezzelino da Romano, Henry's imperial vicar in northern Italy, the Eccerinus, which was probably not represented on the stage. This remained an isolated work.

The development of the drama in the 15th century was very great. This kind of semi-popular literature was born in Florence, and attached itself to certain popular festivities that were usually held in honor of St John the Baptist, patron saint of the city. The Sacra Rappresentazione is the development of the medieval Mistero (mystery play). Although it belonged to popular poetry, some of its authors were literary men of much renown: Lorenzo de Medici, for example, wrote San Giovanni e Paolo, and Feo Belcari wrote San Panunzio, Abramo ed Isaac, and more. From the 15th century, some element of the comic-profane found its way into the Sacra Rappresentazione. From its Biblical and legendary conventionalism Poliziano emancipated himself in his Orfeo, which, although in its exterior form belonging to the sacred representations, yet substantially detaches itself from them in its contents and in the artistic element introduced.

The 16th century: the High Renaissance

The fundamental characteristic of the literary epoch following that of the Renaissance is that it perfected itself in every kind of art, in particular uniting the essentially Italian character of its language with classicism of style. This period lasted from about 1494 to about 1560—1494 being when Charles VIII descended into Italy, marking the beginning of Italy's foreign domination and political decadence.

The famous men of the first half of the 16th century had been educated in the preceding century. Pietro Pomponazzi was born in 1462, Marcello Adriani Virgilio in 1464, Baldassare Castiglione in 1468, Niccolò Machiavelli in 1469, Pietro Bembo in 1470, Michelangelo Buonarroti and Ariosto in 1474, Jacopo Nardi in 1476, Gian Giorgio Trissino in 1478, and Francesco Guicciardini in 1482. Literary activity that appeared from the end of the 15th century to the middle of the 16th century was the product of the political and social conditions of an earlier age.

Baldassare Castiglione

Baldassare Castiglione wrote Il Cortegiano or The Book of the Courtier, a courtesy book dealing with questions of the etiquette and morality of the courtier. Published in 1528, it was very influential in 16th-century European court circles. The Book of the Courtier is a lengthy philosophical dialogue on the topic of what constitutes an ideal courtier or (in the third chapter) court lady, worthy to befriend and advise a Prince or political leader. Inspired by the Spanish court during his time as Ambassador of the Holy See (1524–1529), Castiglione set the narrative of the book in his years as a courtier in his native Duchy of Urbino. The book quickly became enormously popular and was assimilated by its readers into the genre of prescriptive courtesy books or books of manners, dealing with issues of etiquette, self-presentation, and morals, particularly at princely, or royal courts, books such as Giovanni Della Casa's Galateo  (1558) and Stefano Guazzo's The civil conversation (1574). The Book of the Courtier was much more than that, however, having the character of a drama, an open-ended philosophical discussion, and an essay. It has also been seen as a veiled political allegory.

The science of history: Machiavelli and Guicciardini

Niccolò Machiavelli and Francesco Guicciardini were the chief originators of the science of history. Machiavelli's principal works are the Istorie fiorentine, the Discorsi sulla prima deca di Tito Livio, the Arte della guerra and the Principe. His merit consists in having emphasized the experimental side of the study of political action in having observed facts, studied histories and drawn principles from them. His history is sometimes inexact in facts; it is rather a political than an historical work. The peculiarity of Machiavelli's genius lay, as has been said, in his artistic feeling for the treatment and discussion of politics in and for themselves, without regard to an immediate end in his power of abstracting himself from the partial appearances of the transitory present, in order more thoroughly to possess himself of the eternal and inborn kingdom, and to bring it into subjection to himself.

Next to Machiavelli both as an historian and a statesman comes Guicciardini. Guicciardini was very observant, and endeavoured to reduce his observations to a science. His Storia d'Italia, which extends from the death of Lorenzo de Medici to 1534, is full of political wisdom, is skillfully arranged in its parts, gives a lively picture of the character of the persons it treats of, and is written in a grand style. He shows a profound knowledge of the human heart, and depicts with truth the temperaments, the capabilities and habits of the different European nations. Going back to the causes of events, he looked for the explanation of the divergent interests of princes and of their reciprocal jealousies. The fact of his having witnessed many of the events he related, and having taken part in them, adds authority to his words. The political reflections are always deep; in the Pensieri, as Gino Capponi says, he seems to aim at extracting through self-examination a quintessence, as it were, of the things observed and done by him; thus endeavouring to form a political doctrine as adequate as possible in all its parts. Machiavelli and Guicciardini may be considered as distinguished historians as well as originators of the science of history founded on observation.

Inferior to them, but still always worthy of note, were Jacopo Nardi (a just and faithful historian and a virtuous man, who defended the rights of Florence against the Medici before Charles V), Benedetto Varchi, Giambattista Adriani, Bernardo Segni, and, outside Tuscany, Camillo Porzio, who related the Congiura de baroni and the history of Italy from 1547 to 1552; Angelo di Costanza, Pietro Bembo, Paolo Paruta, and others.

Ludovico Ariosto

Ludovico Ariosto's Orlando furioso was a continuation of Boiardo's Innamorato. His characteristic is that he assimilated the romance of chivalry to the style and models of classicism. Romantic Ariosto was an artist only for the love of his art; his epic.

His sole aim was to make a romance that would please himself and his generation. His Orlando has no grave and serious purpose. On the contrary, it creates a fantastic world in which the poet rambles, indulges his caprice, and sometimes smiles at his own work. His great desire is to depict everything with the greatest possible perfection; the cultivation of style is what occupies him most. In his hands the style becomes wonderfully plastic to every conception, whether high or low, serious or sportive. With him, the octave stanza reached a high level of grace, variety, and harmony.

Pietro Bembo

Pietro Bembo was an influential figure in the development of the Italian language, specifically Tuscan, as a literary medium, and his writings assisted in the 16th-century revival of interest in the works of Petrarch. As a writer, Bembo attempted to restore some of the legendary "affect" that ancient Greek had on its hearers, but in Tuscan Italian instead. He held as his model, and as the highest example of poetic expression ever achieved in Italian, the work of Petrarch and Boccaccio, two 14th-century writers he assisted in bringing back into fashion.

In the Prose della volgar lingua, he set Petrarch up as the perfect model, and discussed verse composition in detail, including rhyme, stress, the sounds of words, balance and variety. In Bembo's theory, the specific placement of words in a poem, with strict attention to their consonants and vowels, their rhythm, their position within lines long and short, could produce emotions ranging from sweetness and grace to gravity and grief in a listener. This work was of decisive importance in the development of the Italian madrigal, the most famous secular musical form of the 16th century, as it was these poems, carefully constructed (or, in the case of Petrarch, analyzed) according to Bembo's ideas, that were to be the primary texts for the music.

Torquato Tasso

The historians of Italian literature are in doubt whether Torquato Tasso should be placed in the period of the highest development of the Renaissance, or whether he should form a period by himself, intermediate between that and the one following. Certainly he was profoundly out of harmony with his own century. His religious faith, the seriousness of his character, the deep melancholy settled in his heart, his continued aspiration after an ideal perfection—all place him outside the literary epoch represented by Machiavelli, Ariosto, and Berni. As Carducci said, Tasso is the legitimate heir of Dante: he believes, and reasons on his faith by philosophy; he loves, and comments on his love in a learned style; he is an artist, and writes dialogues of scholastic speculation that would be considered Platonic. He was only eighteen years old when, in 1562, he tried his hand at epic poetry, and wrote Rinaldo, in which be said that he had tried to reconcile the Aristotelian rules with the variety of Ariosto. He later wrote the Aminta, a pastoral drama of exquisite grace, but the work to which he had long turned his thoughts was an heroic poem, and that absorbed all his powers. He explains his intentions in the three Discorsi, written while he composed the Gerusalemme: he would choose a great and wonderful subject, not so ancient as to have lost all interest, nor so recent as to prevent the poet from embellishing it with invented circumstances. He would treat it rigorously according to the rules of the unity of action observed in Greek and Latin poems, but with a far greater variety and splendour of episodes, so that in this point it should not fall short of the romantic poem; and finally, he would write it in a lofty and ornate style. This is what Tasso has done in the Gerusalemme liberata, the subject of which is the liberation of the sepulchre of Jesus Christ in the 11th century by Godfrey of Bouillon. The poet does not follow faithfully all the historical facts, but sets before us the principal causes of them, bringing in the supernatural agency of God and Satan. The Gerusalemme is the best heroic poem that Italy can show. It approaches to classical perfection. Its episodes above all are most beautiful. There is profound feeling in it, and everything reflects the melancholy soul of the poet. As regards the style, however, although Tasso studiously endeavoured to keep close to the classical models, one cannot help noticing that he makes excessive use of metaphor, of antithesis, of far-fetched conceits; and it is specially from this point of view that some historians have placed Tasso in the literary period generally known under the name of Secentismo, and that others, more moderate in their criticism, have said that he prepared the way for it.

Minor writers
Meanwhile, there was an attempt at the historical epic. Gian Giorgio Trissino of Vicenza composed a poem called Italia liberata dai Goti. Full of learning and of the rules of the ancients, he formed himself on the latter, in order to sing of the campaigns of Belisarius; he said that he had forced himself to observe all the rules of Aristotle, and that he had imitated Homer. In this again, we see one of the products of the Renaissance; and, although Trissino's work is poor in invention and without any original poetical coloring, yet it helps one to understand better what were the conditions of mind in the 16th century.

Lyric poetry was certainly not one of the kinds that rose to any great height in the 16th century. Originality was entirely wanting, since it seemed in that century as if nothing better could be done than to copy Petrarch. Still, even in this style there were some vigorous poets. Monsignore Giovanni Guidiccioni of Lucca (1500–1541) showed that he had a generous heart. In fine sonnets he expressed his grief for the sad state of his country. Francesco Molza of Modena (1489–1544), learned in Greek, Latin and Hebrew, wrote in a graceful style and with spirit. Giovanni della Casa (1503–1556) and Pietro Bembo (1470–1547), although Petrarchists, were elegant. Even Michelangelo was at times a Petrarchist, but his poems bear the stamp of his extraordinary and original genius. And a good many ladies are to be placed near these poets, such as Vittoria Colonna (loved by Michelangelo), Veronica Gambara, Tullia d'Aragona, and Giulia Gonzaga, poets of great delicacy, and superior in genius to many literary men of their time. Isabella di Morra is a singular example of female poetry of the time, whose sorrowful life was one of the most poignant and tragic stories to emerge from the Italian Renaissance.

Many tragedies were written in the 16th century, but they are all weak. The cause of this was the moral and religious indifference of the Italians, the lack of strong passions and vigorous characters. The first to occupy the tragic stage was Trissino with his Sofonisba, following the rules of the art most scrupulously, but written in sickly verses, and without warmth of feeling. The Oreste and the Rosmunda of Giovanni Rucellai were no better, nor Luigi Alamanni's translation of Antigone. Sperone Speroni in his Canace and Giraldi Cintio in his Orbecche tried to become innovators in tragic literature, but provoked criticisms of grotesquerie and debate over the role of decorum. They were often seen as inferior to the Torrismondo of Torquato Tasso, specially remarkable for the choruses, which sometimes remind one of the chorus of the Greek tragedies.

The Italian comedy of the 16th century was almost entirely modelled on the Latin comedy. They were almost always alike in the plot, in the characters of the old man, of the servant, of the waiting-maid; and the argument was often the same. Thus the Lucidi of Agnolo Firenzuola, and the Vecchio amoroso of Donato Giannotti were modelled on comedies by Plautus, as were the Sporta by Giambattista Gelli, the Marito by Lodovico Dolce, and others. There appear to be only three writers who should be distinguished among the many who wrote comedies: Machiavelli, Ariosto, and Giovan Maria Cecchi. In his Mandragola Machiavelli, unlike the others, composed a comedy of character, creating personalities that seem living even now because he copied them from reality with a finely observant eye. Ariosto, on the other hand, was distinguished for his picture of the habits of his time, and especially of those of the Ferrarese nobles, rather than for the objective delineation of character. Lastly, Cecchi left in his comedies a treasure of spoken language, which lets us, in a wonderful way, acquaint ourselves with that age. The notorious Pietro Aretino might also be included in the list of the best writers of comedy.

The 15th century included humorous poetry. Antonio Cammelli, surnamed the Pistoian, is specially deserving of notice, because of his pungent bonhomie, as Sainte-Beuve called it. But it was Francesco Berni who and satire, carried this kind of literature to perfection in the 16th century. From him the style has been called "Bernesque poetry". In the Berneschi we find nearly the same phenomenon that we already noticed with regard to Orlando furioso. It was art for arts sake that inspired and moved Berni to write, as well as Antonio Francesco Grazzini, called Il Lasca, and other lesser writers. It may be said that there is nothing in their poetry; and it is true that they specially delight in praising low and disgusting things and in jeering at what is noble and serious. Bernesque poetry is the clearest reflection of that religious and moral scepticism that was a characteristic of Italian social life in the 16th century, and that showed itself in most of the works of that period—a scepticism that stopped the religious Reformation in Italy, and which in its turn was an effect of historical conditions. The Berneschi, and especially Berni himself, sometimes assumed a satirical tone. But theirs could not be called true satire. Pure satirists, on the other hand, were Antonio Vinciguerra, a Venetian, Lodovico Alamanni and Ariosto, the last superior to the others for the Attic elegance of his style, and for a certain frankness, passing into malice, which is particularly interesting when the poet talks of himself.

In the 16th century there were not a few didactic works. In his poem Le Api Giovanni Rucellai approaches the perfection of Virgil. His style is clear and light, and he adds interest to his book by frequent allusions to the events of the time. The most important didactic work, however, is Castiglione's Cortigiano, in which he imagines a discussion in the palace of the dukes of Urbino between knights and ladies as to what gifts a perfect courtier requires. This book is valuable as an illustration of the intellectual and moral state of the highest Italian society in the first half of the 16th century.

Of the novelists of the 16th century, the two most important were Grazzini, and Matteo Bandello; the former as playful and bizarre as the latter is grave and solemn. Bandello was a Dominican friar and a bishop, but that notwithstanding his novels were very loose in subject, and that he often holds up the ecclesiastics of his time to ridicule.

At a time when admiration for qualities of style, the desire for classical elegance, was so strong as in the 16th century, much attention was naturally paid to translating Latin and Greek authors. Among the very numerous translations of the time those of the Aeneid and of the Pastorals of Longus the Sophist by Annibale Caro are still famous; as are also the translations of Ovid's Metamorphoses by Giovanni Andrea dell' Anguillara, of Apuleius's The Golden Ass by Firenzuola, and of Plutarch's Lives and Moralia by Marcello Adriani.

The 17th century: A period of decadence

From about the Treaty of Cateau-Cambresis (1559), after which centuries of domination of foreign nations over Italy followed, began a period of decadence in Italian literature. Tommaso Campanella was tortured by the Inquisition, and Giordano Bruno was burned at the stake. Cesare Balbo says that, if the happiness of the masses consists in peace without industry, if the nobility's consists in titles without power, if princes are satisfied by acquiescence in their rule without real independence, without sovereignty, if literary men and artists are content to write, paint and build with the approbation of their contemporaries, but to the contempt of posterity, if a whole nation is happy in ease without dignity and the tranquil progress of corruption, then no period ever was so happy for Italy as the 140 years from the Peace of Cateau Cambrésis to the War of the Spanish Succession. This period is known in the history of Italian literature as the Secentismo. Its writers resorted to exaggeration; they tried to produce effect with what in art is called mannerism or barocchism. Writers vied with one another in their use of metaphors, affectations, hyperbole and other oddities and draw it off from the substantial element of thought.

Marinism

At the head of the school of the Secentisti was Giambattista Marino of Naples, born in 1569, especially known for his long poem, L'Adone. He used the most extravagant metaphors, the most forced antitheses and the most far-fetched conceits. He strings antitheses together one after the other, so that they fill up whole stanzas without a break. Claudio Achillini of Bologna followed in Marino's footsteps, but his peculiarities were even more extravagant. Almost all the poets of the 17th century were more or less infected with Marinism. Alessandro Guidi, although he does not attain to the exaggeration of his master, is bombastic and turgid, while Fulvio Testi is artificial and affected. Yet Guidi as well as Testi felt the influence of another poet, Gabriello Chiabrera, born at Savona in 1552. Enamoured of the Greeks, he made new metres, especially in imitation of Pindar, treating of religious, moral, historical, and amatory subjects. Chiabrera, though elegant in form, attempts to disguise a lack of substance with poetical ornaments of every kind. Nevertheless, Chiabrera's school marks an improvement; and sometimes he shows lyrical capacities, wasted on his literary environment.

Arcadia

The belief arose that it would be necessary to change the form in order to restore literature and so, in 1690, the Academy of Arcadia was instituted. Its founders were Giovan Maria Crescimbeni and Gian Vincenzo Gravina. The Arcadia was so called because its chief aim was to imitate the simplicity of the ancient shepherds who were supposed to have lived in Arcadia in the golden age. As the Secentisti erred by an overweening desire for novelty, so the Arcadians proposed to return to the fields of truth, always singing of subjects of pastoral simplicity. This was merely the substitution of a new artifice for the old one; and they fell from bombast into effeminacy, from the hyperbolical into the petty, from the turgid into the over-refined. The poems of the Arcadians fill many volumes, and are made up of sonnets, madrigals, canzonette and blank verse. The one who most distinguished himself among the sonneteers was Felice Zappi. Among the authors of songs, Paolo Rolli was illustrious. Innocenzo Frugoni was more famous than all the others, a man of fruitful imagination but of shallow intellect. The members of the Arcadia was almost exclusively men, but at least one woman, Maria Antonia Scalera Stellini, managed to be elected on poetical merits.

Vincenzo da Filicaja, a Florentine, had a lyric talent, particularly in the songs about Vienna besieged by the Turks, which raised him above the vices of the time; but even in him we see clearly the rhetorical artifice and false conceits. In general all the lyric poetry of the 17th century had the same defects, but in different degrees. These defects may be summed up as absence of feeling and exaggeration of form.

The independent thinkers

Whilst the political and social conditions in Italy in the 17th century made it appear that every light of intelligence was extinguished, some strong and independent thinkers, such as Bernardino Telesio, Lucilio Vanini, Giordano Bruno and Tommaso Campanella turned philosophical inquiry into fresh channels, and opened the way for the scientific conquests of Galileo Galilei, the great contemporary of René Descartes in France and of Francis Bacon in England. Galileo was not only a great man of science, but also occupied a conspicuous place in the history of letters. A devoted student of Ariosto, he seemed to transfuse into his prose the qualities of that great poet: clear and frank freedom of expression, precision and ease, and at the same time elegance.

Another symptom of revival, a sign of rebellion against the vileness of Italian social life, is given us in satire, particularly that of Salvator Rosa and Alessandro Tassoni. Rosa, born in 1615 near Naples, was a painter, a musician and a poet. As a poet he mourned the sad condition of his country, and gave vent to his feeling (as another satire-writer, Giuseppe Giusti, said) in generosi rabbuffi. He was a precursor of modern times. Tassoni showed independent judgment in the midst of universal servility, and his Secchia Rapita proved that he was an eminent writer. This is an heroic comic poem, which is at the same time an epic and a personal satire. He was bold enough to attack the Spaniards in his Filippiche, in which he urged Duke Carlo Emanuele of Savoy to persist in the war against them.

Agriculture
Paganino Bonafede in the Tesoro de rustici gave many precepts in agriculture, beginning that kind of georgic poetry later fully developed by Alamanni in his Coltivazione, by Girolamo Baruffaldi in the Canapajo, by Rucellai in Le api, by Bartolomeo Lorenzi in the Coltivazione de' monti, and by Giambattista Spolverini in the Coltivazione del riso.

The revival in the 18th century: the Age of Reason and Reform

In the 18th century, the political condition of Italy began to improve, under Joseph II, Holy Roman Emperor, and his successors. These princes were influenced by philosophers, who in their turn felt the influence of a general movement of ideas at large in many parts of Europe, sometimes called The Enlightenment.

History and society: Vico, Muratori and Beccaria

Giambattista Vico showed the awakening of historical consciousness in Italy. In his Scienza nuova, he investigated the laws governing the progress of the human race, and according to which events develop. From the psychological study of man he tried to infer the comune natura delle nazioni, i.e., the universal laws of history, by which civilizations rise, flourish and fall. From the same scientific spirit that inspired Vico came a different kind of investigation, that of the sources of Italian civil and literary history.

Lodovico Antonio Muratori, after having collected in his Rerum Italicarum scriptores the chronicles, biographies, letters and diaries of Italian history from 500 to 1500, and having discussed the most obscure historical questions in the Antiquitates Italicae medii aevi, wrote the Annali d'Italia, minutely narrating facts derived from authentic sources. Muratori's associates in his historical research were Scipione Maffei of Verona and Apostolo Zeno of Venice. In his Verona illustrata Maffei left a treasure of learning that was also an excellent historical monograph. Zeno added much to the erudition of literary history, both in his Dissertazioni Vossiane and in his notes to the Biblioteca dell'eloquenza italiana of Monsignore Giusto Fontanini. Girolamo Tiraboschi and Count Giovanni Maria Mazzuchelli of Brescia devoted themselves to literary history.

While the new spirit of the times led to the investigation of historical sources, it also encouraged inquiry into the mechanism of economic and social laws. Francesco Galiani wrote on currency; Gaetano Filangieri wrote a Scienza della legislazione. Cesare Beccaria, in his Trattato dei delitti e delle pene, made a contribution to the reform of the penal system and promoted the abolition of torture.

Metastasio and the melodrama

The reforming movement sought to throw off the conventional and the artificial, and to return to truth. Apostolo Zeno and Pietro Metastasio (the Arcadian name for Pietro Trapassi, a native of Rome) had endeavoured to make melodrama and reason compatible. Metastasio gave fresh expression to the affections, a natural turn to the dialogue and some interest to the plot; if he had not fallen into constant unnatural overrefinement and mawkishness, and into frequent anachronisms, he might have been considered the most important writer of opera seria libretti and the first dramatic reformer of the 18th century.

Carlo Goldoni

Carlo Goldoni, a Venetian, overcame resistance from the old popular form of comedy, with the masks of pantalone, of the doctor, harlequin, Brighella, etc., and created the comedy of character, following Molière's example. Goldoni's characters are often superficial, but he wrote lively dialogue. He produced over 150 comedies, and had no time to polish and perfect his works; but for a comedy of character we must go straight from Machiavelli's Mandragola to him. Goldoni's dramatic aptitude is illustrated by the fact that he took nearly all his types from Venetian society, yet managed to give them an inexhaustible variety. Many of his comedies were written in Venetian.

His works include some of Italy's most famous and best-loved plays. Audiences have admired the plays of Goldoni for their ingenious mix of wit and honesty. His plays offered his contemporaries images of themselves, often dramatizing the lives, values, and conflicts of the emerging middle classes. Goldoni also wrote under the pen name and title Polisseno Fegeio, Pastor Arcade, which he claimed in his memoirs the "Arcadians of Rome" bestowed on him.

One of his best known works is the comic play Servant of Two Masters, which has been translated and adapted internationally numerous times. In 1966 it was adapted into an opera buffa by the American composer Vittorio Giannini. In 2011, Richard Bean adapted the play for the National Theatre of Great Britain as One Man, Two Guvnors. Its popularity led to a transfer to the West End and in 2012 to Broadway. The film Carlo Goldoni – Venice, Grand Theatre of the World, directed by Alessandro Bettero, was released in 2007 and is available in English, Italian, French, and Japanese.

Giuseppe Parini

The leading figure of the literary revival of the 18th century was Giuseppe Parini. Born in a Lombard village in 1729, he was educated at Milan, and as a youth was known among the Arcadian poets by the name of Darisbo Elidonio. Even as an Arcadian, Parini showed originality. In a collection of poems he published at twenty-three years of age, under the name of Ripano Eupilino, the poet shows his faculty of taking his scenes from real life, and in his satirical pieces he exhibits a spirit of outspoken opposition to his own times. These poems, though derivative, indicate a resolute determination to challenge the literary conventionalities. Improving on the poems of his youth, he showed himself an innovator in his lyrics, rejecting at once Petrarchism, Secentismo and Arcadia, the three maladies that he thought had weakened Italian art in the preceding centuries.  In the Odi the satirical note is already heard, but it comes out more strongly in Del giorno, in which he imagines himself to be teaching a young Milanese patrician all the habits and ways of gallant life; he shows up all its ridiculous frivolities, and with delicate irony unmasks the futilities of aristocratic habits. Dividing the day into four parts, the Mattino, the Mezzogiorno, the Vespero, and the Notte, he describes the trifles of which they were made up, and the book thus assumes major social and historical value. As an artist, going straight back to classical forms, aspiring to imitate Virgil and Dante, he opened the way to the school of Vittorio Alfieri, Ugo Foscolo and Vincenzo Monti. As a work of art, the Giorno is wonderful for its delicate irony. The verse has new harmonies; sometimes it is a little hard and broken, as a protest against the Arcadian monotony.

Linguistic purism
Whilst the most burning political passions were raging, and whilst the most brilliant men of genius in the new classical and patriotic school were purists at the height of their influence, a question arose about purism of language. In the second half of the 18th century the Italian language was specially full of French expressions. There was great indifference about fitness, still more about elegance of style. Prose needed to be restored for the sake of national dignity, and it was believed that this could not be done except by going back to the writers of the 14th century, to the aurei trecentisti, as they were called, or else to the classics of Italian literature. One of the promoters of the new school was Antonio Cesari of Verona, who republished ancient authors, and brought out a new edition, with additions, of the Vocabolario della Crusca. He wrote a dissertation Sopra lo stato presente della lingua italiana, and endeavoured to establish the supremacy of Tuscan and of the three great writers, Dante, Petrarch, and Boccaccio. In accordance with that principle he wrote several books, taking pains to copy the trecentisti as closely as possible. But patriotism in Italy has always had something municipal in it; so to this Tuscan supremacy, proclaimed and upheld by Cesari, there was opposed a Lombard school, which would know nothing of Tuscan, and with Dante's De vulgari eloquentia returned to the idea of the lingua illustre.

This was an old question, largely and bitterly argued in the Cinquecento (16th century) by Varchi, Muzio, Lodovico Castelvetro, Speroni, and others. Now the question was raised afresh. At the head of the Lombard school were Monti and his son-in-law Count Giulio Perticari. This caused Monti to write Pro pasta di alcune correzioni ed aggiunte al vocabolario della Crusca, in which he attacked the Tuscanism of the Accademia della Crusca, but in a graceful and easy style, so as to form a prose that is one of the most beautiful in Italian literature. Perticari, whose intellect was inferior, narrowed and exacerbated the question in two treatises, Degli scrittori del Trecento and Dell'amor patrio di Dante. The dispute about language took its place beside literary and political disputes, and all Italy took part in it: Basilio Puoti at Naples, Paolo Costa in the Romagna, Marc Antonio Parenti at Modena, Salvatore Betti at Rome, Giovanni Gherardini in Lombardy, Luigi Fornaciari at Lucca, and Vincenzo Nannucci at Florence.

A patriot, a classicist and a purist all at once was Pietro Giordani, born in 1774; he was almost a compendium of the literary movement of the time. His whole life was a battle for liberty. Learned in Greek and Latin authors, and in the Italian trecentisti, he left only a few writings, but they were carefully elaborated in point of style, and his prose was greatly admired in its time. Giordani closes the literary epoch of the classicists.

Minor writers
Gasparo Gozzi's satire was less elevated, but directed towards the same end as Parini's. In his Osservatore, something like Joseph Addison's Spectator, in his Gazzetta veneta, and in the Mondo morale, by means of allegories and novelties he hit the vices with a delicate touch, introducing a practical moral. Gozzi's satire has some slight resemblance in style to Lucian's. Gozzi's prose is graceful and lively, but imitates the writers of the 14th century. Another satirical writer of the first half of the 18th century was Giuseppe Baretti of Turin. In a journal called the Frusta letteraria he mercilessly criticized the works then being published in Italy. He had learnt much by travelling; his long stay in Britain had contributed to the independent character of his mind. The Frusta was the first book of independent criticism directed particularly against the Arcadians and the pedants.

In 1782 was born Giambattista Niccolini. In literature he was a classicist; in politics he was a Ghibelline, a rare exception in Guelph Florence, his birthplace. In imitating Aeschylus, as well as in writing the Discorsi sulla tragedia greca, and on the Sublime Michelangelo, Niccolini displayed his passionate devotion to ancient literature. In his tragedies he set himself free from the excessive rigidity of Alfieri, and partly approached the English and German tragic authors. He nearly always chose political subjects, striving to keep alive in his compatriots the love of liberty. Such are Nabucco, Antonio Foscarini, Giovanni da Procida, Lodovico il Moro and others. He assailed papal Rome in Arnaldo da Brescia, a long tragic piece, not suited for acting, and epic rather than dramatic. Niccolini's tragedies show a rich lyric vein rather than dramatic genius. He has the merit of having vindicated liberal ideas, and of having opened a new path to Italian tragedy.

Carlo Botta, born in 1766, was a spectator of French spoliation in Italy and of the overbearing rule of Napoleon. He wrote a History of Italy from 1789 to 1814; and later continued Guicciardini's History up to 1789. He wrote after the manner of the Latin authors, trying to imitate Livy, putting together long and sonorous periods in a style that aimed at being like Boccaccio's, caring little about what constitutes the critical material of history, only intent on declaiming his academic prose for his country's benefit. Botta wanted to be classical in a style that could no longer be so, and hence he failed completely to attain his literary goal. His fame is only that of a man of a noble and patriotic heart. Not so bad as the two histories of Italy is that of the Guerra dell'indipendenza americana.

Close to Botta comes Pietro Colletta, a Neapolitan born nine years after him. He also in his Storia del reame di Napoli dal 1734 al 1825 had the idea of defending the independence and liberty of Italy in a style borrowed from Tacitus; and he succeeded rather better than Botta. He has a rapid, brief, nervous style, which makes his book attractive reading. But it is said that Pietro Giordani and Gino Capponi corrected it for him. Lazzaro Papi of Lucca, author of the Commentari della rivoluzione francese dal 1789 al 1814, was not altogether unlike Botta and Colletta. He also was an historian in the classical style, and treats his subject with patriotic feeling; but as an artist he perhaps excels the other two.

Alberto Fortis started the Morlachist literary movement in Italian and Venetian literature with his 1774 work Viaggio in Dalmazia ("Journey to Dalmatia").

The Revolution: Patriotism and classicism
The ideas behind the French Revolution of 1789 gave a special direction to Italian literature in the second half of the 18th century. Love of liberty and desire for equality created a literature aimed at national objects, seeking to improve the condition of the country by freeing it from the double yoke of political and religious despotism. The Italians who aspired to political redemption believed it inseparable from an intellectual revival, and thought that this could only be effected by a reunion with ancient classicism. This was a repetition of what had occurred in the first half of the 15th century.

Vittorio Alfieri

Patriotism and classicism were the two principles that inspired the literature that began with Vittorio Alfieri. He worshipped the Greek and Roman idea of popular liberty in arms against tyranny. He took the subjects of his tragedies from the history of these nations and made his ancient characters talk like revolutionists of his time. The Arcadian school, with its verbosity and triviality, was rejected. His aim was to be brief, concise, strong and bitter, to aim at the sublime as opposed to the lowly and pastoral. He saved literature from Arcadian vacuities, leading it towards a national end, and armed himself with patriotism and classicism.

It is to his dramas that Alfieri is chiefly indebted for the high reputation he has attained. Before his time the Italian language, so harmonious in the Sonnets of Petrarch and so energetic in the Commedia of Dante, had been invariably languid and prosaic in dramatic dialogue. The pedantic and inanimate tragedies of the 16th century were followed, during the Iron Age of Italian literature, by dramas of which extravagance in the sentiments and improbability in the action were the chief characteristics. The prodigious success of the Merope of Maffei, which appeared in the commencement of the 18th century, may be attributed more to a comparison with such productions than to intrinsic merit. In this degradation of tragic taste the appearance of the tragedies of Alfieri was perhaps the most important literary event that had occurred in Italy during the 18th century.

Vincenzo Monti

Vincenzo Monti was a patriot too, but in his own way. He had no one deep feeling that ruled him, or rather the mobility of his feelings is his characteristic; but each of these was a new form of patriotism that took the place of an old one. He saw danger to his country in the French Revolution, and wrote the Pellegrino apostolico, the Bassvilliana and the Feroniade; Napoleon's victories caused him to write the Pronreteo and the Musagonia; in his Fanatismo and his Superstizione he attacked the papacy; afterwards he sang the praises of the Austrians. Thus every great event made him change his mind, with a readiness that might seem incredible, but is easily explained. Monti was, above everything, an artist. Everything else in him was liable to change. Knowing little Greek, he succeeded in translating the Iliad in a way remarkable for its Homeric feeling, and in his Bassvilliana he is on a level with Dante. In him classical poetry seemed to revive in all its florid grandeur.

Ugo Foscolo

Ugo Foscolo was an eager patriot, inspired by classical models. The Lettere di Jacopo Ortis, inspired by Goethe's Werther, are a love story with a mixture of patriotism; they contain a violent protest against the Treaty of Campo Formio, and an outburst from Foscolo's own heart about an unhappy love-affair of his. His passions were sudden and violent. To one of these passions Ortis owed its origin, and it is perhaps the best and most sincere of all his writings. He is still sometimes pompous and rhetorical, but less so than, for example, in the lectures Dell'origine e dell'ufficio della letteratura. On the whole, Foscolo's prose is turgid and affected, and reflects the character of a man who always tried to pose in dramatic attitudes. This was indeed the defect of the Napoleonic epoch; there was a horror of anything common, simple, natural; everything must assume some heroic shape. In Foscolo this tendency was excessive. The Sepolcri, which is his best poem, was prompted by high feeling, and the mastery of versification shows wonderful art. There are most obscure passages in it, where it seems even the author did not form a clear idea. He left incomplete three hymns to the Graces, in which he sang of beauty as the source of courtesy, of all high qualities and of happiness. Among his prose works a high place belongs to his translation of the Sentimental Journey of Laurence Sterne, a writer by whom Foscolo was deeply affected. He went as an exile to England, and died there. He wrote for English readers some Essays on Petrarch and on the texts of the Decamerone and of Dante, which are remarkable for when they were written, and which may have initiated a new kind of literary criticism in Italy. Foscolo is still greatly admired, and not without reason. The men who made the revolution of 1848 were brought up on his work.

19th century: Romanticism and the Risorgimento

The romantic school had as its organ the Conciliatore established in 1818 at Milan, on the staff of which were Silvio Pellico, Ludovico di Breme, Giovile Scalvini, Tommaso Grossi, Giovanni Berchet, Samuele Biava, and Alessandro Manzoni. All were influenced by the ideas that, especially in Germany, constituted the movement called Romanticism. In Italy the course of literary reform took another direction.

Alessandro Manzoni

The main instigator of the reform was Alessandro Manzoni. He formulated the objects of the new school, saying that it aspired to try to discover and express il vero storico and il vero morale, not only as an end, but as the widest and eternal source of the beautiful. It is realism in art that characterizes Italian literature from Manzoni onwards. 

The Promessi Sposi (The Betrothed) is the work that has made him immortal. Manzoni succeeded in something more than an historical novel in the narrow meaning of that word; he created an eminently realistic work of art. The reader's attention is entirely fixed on the powerful objective creation of the characters. From the greatest to the least they have a wonderful verisimilitude. Manzoni is able to unfold a character in all particulars and to follow it through its different phases. Don Abbondio and Renzo are as perfect as Azzeccagarbugli and Il Sarto. Manzoni dives down into the innermost recesses of the human heart, and draws from it the most subtle psychological reality. In this his greatness lies, which was recognized first by his companion in genius, Goethe. The Promessi Sposi is generally ranked among the masterpieces of world literature. The novel is also a symbol of the Italian Risorgimento, both for its patriotic message and because it was a fundamental milestone in the development of the modern, unified Italian language. 

As a poet too he had gleams of genius, especially in the Napoleonic ode, Il Cinque Maggio, and where he describes human affections, as in some stanzas of the Inni and in the chorus of the Adelchi.

Giacomo Leopardi

The great poet of the age was Giacomo Leopardi, born thirteen years after Manzoni at Recanati, of a patrician family. He became so familiar with Greek authors that he used afterwards to say that the Greek mode of thought was more clear and living to his mind than the Latin or even the Italian. Solitude, sickness, and domestic tyranny prepared him for profound melancholy. He passed into complete religious scepticism, from which he sought rest in art. He was also an admirable prose writer. In his Operette Morali—dialogues and discourses marked by a cold and bitter smile at human destinies that freezes the reader—the clearness of style, the simplicity of language and the depth of conception are such that perhaps he is not only the greatest lyrical poet since Dante, but also one of the most perfect writers of prose that Italian literature has had. He is widely seen as one of the most radical and challenging thinkers of the 19th century but routinely compared by Italian critics to his older contemporary Alessandro Manzoni despite expressing "diametrically opposite positions." The strongly lyrical quality of his poetry made him a central figure on the European and international literary and cultural landscape.

History and politics in the 19th
As realism in art gained ground, the positive method in criticism kept pace with it. History returned to its spirit of learned research, as is shown in such works as the Archivio storico italiano, established at Florence by Giampietro Vieusseux, the Storia d'Italia nel medio evo by Carlo Troya, a remarkable treatise by Manzoni himself, Sopra alcuni punti della storia longobardica in Italia, and the very fine history of the Vespri siciliani by Michele Amari. Alongside the great artists Leopardi and Manzoni, alongside the learned scholars, there was also in the 19th century a patriotic literature. Vieusseux had a distinct political object when in 1820 he established the monthly review Antologia. His Archivio storico italiano (1842) was, under a different form, a continuation of the Antologia, which was suppressed in 1833 owing to the action of the Russian government. Florence was in those days the asylum of all the Italian exiles, and these exiles met and shook hands in Vieusseux's rooms, where there was more literary than political talk, but where one thought and one only animated all minds, the thought of Italy.

The literary movement that preceded and was contemporary with the political revolution of 1848 may be said to be represented by four writers - Giuseppe Giusti, Francesco Domenico Guerrazzi, Vincenzo Gioberti and Cesare Balbo. Giusti wrote epigrammatic satires in popular language. In incisive phrases he scourged the enemies of Italy. He was a telling political writer, but a mediocre poet. Guerrazzi had a great reputation and great influence, but his historical novels, though avidly read before 1848, were soon forgotten. Gioberti, a powerful polemical writer, had a noble heart and a great mind; his philosophical works are now as good as dead, but the Primato morale e civile degli Italiani will last as an important document of the times, and the Gesuita moderno is the most tremendous indictment of the Jesuits ever written in Italy. Balbo was an earnest student of history, and made history useful for politics. Like Gioberti in his first period, Balbo was zealous for the civil papacy, and for a federation of the Italian states presided over by it. His Sommario della storia d'Italia is an excellent epitome.

Between the 19th and 20th century

After the Risorgimento, political literature becomes less important. The first part of this period is characterized by two divergent trends of literature that both opposed Romanticism.

The first trend is the Scapigliatura, that attempted to rejuvenate Italian culture through foreign influences, notably from the poetry of Charles Baudelaire and the works of American writer Edgar Allan Poe. The second trend is represented by Giosuè Carducci, a dominant figure of this period, fiery opponent of the Romantics and restorer of the ancient metres and spirit who, great as a poet, was scarcely less distinguished as a literary critic and historian.

The influence of Émile Zola is evident in the Verismo. Luigi Capuana but most notably Giovanni Verga and were its main exponents and the authors of a verismo manifesto. Capuana published the novel Giacinta, generally regarded as the "manifesto" of Italian verismo. Unlike French naturalism, which was based on positivistic ideals, Verga and Capuana rejected claims of the scientific nature and social usefulness of the movement.

Instead Decadentism was based mainly on the Decadent style of some artists and authors of France and England about the end of the 19th century. The main authors of the Italian version were Antonio Fogazzaro, Giovanni Pascoli, best known by his Myricae and Poemetti, and Gabriele D'Annunzio. Although differing stylistically, they championed idiosyncrasy and irrationality against scientific rationalism. Gabriele d'Annunzio produced original work in poetry, drama and fiction, of extraordinary originality. He began with some lyrics distinguished no less by their exquisite beauty of form than by their licence, and these characteristics reappeared in a long series of poems, plays and novels.

Edmondo de Amicis is better known for his moral works and travels than for his fiction. Of the women novelists, Matilde Serao and Grazia Deledda became popular. Deledda was awarded the 1926 Nobel Prize in Literature for her works.

Minor writers
Giovanni Prati and Aleardo Aleardi continue romantic traditions.  Other classical poets are Giuseppe Chiarini, Arturo Graf, Guido Mazzoni and Giovanni Marradi, of whom the two last named may perhaps be regarded as special disciples of Carducci. Enrico Panzacchi was at heart still a romantic. Olindo Guerrini (who wrote under the pseudonym of Lorenzo Stecchetti) is the chief representative of verismo in poetry, and, though his early works obtained a succès de scandale, he is the author of many lyrics of intrinsic value. Alfredo Baccelli and Mario Rapisardi are epic poets of distinction. Felice Cavallotti is the author of the stirring Marcia de Leonida.

Among dialect writers, the great Roman poet Giuseppe Gioacchino Belli found numerous successors, such as Renato Fucini (Pisa) and Cesare Pascarella (Rome). Among the women poets, Ada Negri, with her socialistic Fatalità and Tempeste, achieved a great reputation; and others, such as Annie Vivanti, were highly esteemed in Italy.

Among the dramatists, Pietro Cossa in tragedy, Ferdinando Martini, and Paolo Ferrari in comedy, represent the older schools. More modern methods were adopted by Giuseppe Giacosa.

In fiction, the historical romance fell into disfavour, though Emilio de Marchi produced some good examples. The novel of intrigue was cultivated by Salvatore Farina.

20th century and beyond

Important early-20th-century writers include Italo Svevo, the author of La coscienza di Zeno (1923), and Luigi Pirandello (winner of the 1934 Nobel Prize in Literature), who explored the shifting nature of reality in his prose fiction and such plays as Sei personaggi in cerca d'autore (Six Characters in Search of an Author, 1921).
Federigo Tozzi was a great novelist, critically appreciated only in recent years, and considered one of the forerunners of existentialism in the European novel.

Grazia Deledda was a Sardinian writer who focused on the life, customs, and traditions of the Sardinian people in her works. She has not gained much recognition as a feminist writer potentially due to her themes of women's pain and suffering. In 1926 she won the Nobel Prize for literature, becoming Italy's first and only woman recipient.

Sibilla Aleramo (1876-1960) was born in Milan as Rina Faccio. Faccio published her first novel, Una Donna (A Woman)  under her pen name in 1906. Today the novel is widely acknowledged as Italy's premier feminist novel. Her writing mixes together autobiographical and fictional elements.

Maria Messina was a Sicilian writer who focused heavily on Sicilian culture with a dominant theme being the isolation and oppression of young Sicilian women. She achieved modest recognition during her life including receiving the Medaglia D'oro Prize for "La Mérica".

Anna Banti was born in Florence in 1895. She is most well known for her short story Il Coraggio Delle Donne (The Courage of Women) which was published in 1940. Her autobiographical work, Un Grido Lacerante, was published in 1981 and won the Antonio Feltrinelli prize. As well as being a successful author, Banti is recognized as a literary, cinematic, and art critic.

Elsa Morante was born in Rome in 1912. She began writing at an early age and self-educated herself developing a love music and books. One of the central themes in Morante's works is narcissism. She also uses love as a metaphor in her works, saying that love can be passion and obsession and can lead to despair and destruction. She won the Premio Viareggio award in 1948.

Alba de Céspedes was a Cuban-Italian writer from Rome. She was an anti-Fascist and was involved in the Italian Resistance. Her work was greatly influenced by the history and culture that developed around World War II. Although her books were bestsellers, Alba has been overlooked in recent studies of Italian women writers.

Poetry was represented by the Crepuscolari and the Futurists; the foremost member of the latter group was Filippo Tommaso Marinetti. Leading Modernist poets from later in the century include Salvatore Quasimodo (winner of the 1959 Nobel Prize in Literature), Giuseppe Ungaretti, Umberto Saba, who won fame for his collection of poems Il canzoniere, and Eugenio Montale (winner of the 1975 Nobel Prize in Literature). They were described by critics as "hermeticists".

Neorealism was developed by Alberto Moravia (e.g. Il conformista, 1951), Primo Levi, who documented his experiences in Auschwitz in Se questo è un uomo (If This Is a Man, 1947) and other books, Cesare Pavese (e.g. The Moon and the Bonfires (1949), Corrado Alvaro and Elio Vittorini.

Dino Buzzati wrote fantastic and allegorical fiction that critics have compared to Kafka and Beckett. Italo Calvino also ventured into fantasy in the trilogy I nostri antenati (Our Ancestors, 1952–1959) and post-modernism in the novel Se una notte d'inverno un viaggiatore... (If on a Winter's Night a Traveller, 1979).
Carlo Emilio Gadda was the author of the experimental Quer pasticciaccio brutto de via Merulana (1957). Pier Paolo Pasolini was a controversial poet and novelist.

Giuseppe Tomasi di Lampedusa wrote only one novel, Il Gattopardo (The Leopard, 1958), but it is one of the most famous in Italian literature; it deals with the life of a Sicilian nobleman in the 19th century. Leonardo Sciascia came to public attention with his novel Il giorno della civetta (The Day of the Owl, 1961), exposing the extent of Mafia corruption in modern Sicilian society. More recently, Umberto Eco became internationally successful with the Medieval detective story Il nome della rosa (The Name of the Rose, 1980).

Dacia Maraini is one of the most successful contemporary Italian women writers. Her novels focus on the condition of women in Italy and in some works she speaks to the changes women can make for themselves and for society.

Aldo Busi is also one of the most important Italian contemporary writers. His extensive production of novels, essays, travel books and manuals provides a detailed account of modern society, especially the Italian one. He's also well known as a refined translator from English, German and ancient Italian.

Children's literature

Italy has a long history of children's literature. In 1634, the Pentamerone from Italy became the first major published collection of European folk tales. The Pentamerone contained the first literary European version of the story of Cinderella. The author, Giambattista Basile, created collections of fairy tales that include the oldest recorded forms of many well-known European fairy tales. In the 1550s, Giovanni Francesco Straparola released The Facetious Nights of Straparola. Called the first European storybook to contain fairy-tales, it eventually had 75 separate stories, albeit intended for an adult audience. Giulio Cesare Croce also borrowed from stories children enjoyed for his books.

In 1883, Carlo Collodi wrote The Adventures of Pinocchio, which was also the first Italian fantasy novel. In the same year, Emilio Salgari, the man who would become "the adventure writer par excellence for the young in Italy" published for the first time his famous Sandokan. In the 20th century, Italian children's literature was represented by such writers as Gianni Rodari, author of Il romanzo di Cipollino, and Nicoletta Costa, creator of Julian Rabbit and Olga the Cloud.

Women writers

Italian women writers have always been underrepresented in academia. In many collections of prominent and influential Italian literature, women's works are not included. "A woman writer," Anna Banti once said, "even if successful, is marginalized. They will say that she is great among women writers, but they will not equate her to male writers."  There has been an increase in the inclusion of women in academic scholarship in recent years, but representation is still inequitable. Italian women writers were first acknowledged by critics in the 1960s, and numerous feminist journals began in the 1970s, which increased readers' accessibility to and awareness of their work.

The work of Italian women writers is both progressive and penetrating; through their explorations of the feminine psyche, their critiques of women's social and economic position in Italy, and their depiction of the persistent struggle to achieve equality in a "man's world," they have shattered traditional representations of women in literature.  The page played an important role in the rise of Italian feminism, as it provided women with a space to express their opinions freely, and to portray their lives accurately. Reading and writing fiction became the easiest way for women to explore and determine their place in society.

Italian war novels, such as Alba de Céspedes's Dalla parte di lei (The Best of Husbands, 1949), trace women's awakenings to political realities of the time. Subsequent psychological and social novels of Italian women writers examine the difficult process of growing up for women in Italian society and the other challenges they face, including achieving a socially satisfactory life and using intellectual aspirations to gain equality in society. Examples include Maria Messina's La casa nel vicolo (A House in the Shadows, 1989) and Laura Di Falco's Paura di giorno (Fear of the Day, 1954). After the public condemnation of women's abuse in Italian literature in the 1970s, women writers began expressing their thoughts about sexual difference in novels. Many Italian novels focus on facets of Italian identity, and women writers have always been leaders in this genre.

Italians awarded with the Nobel Prize for literature

See also

 Languages of Italy
 Italian language
 Regional Italian

References

Bibliography

Further reading
Important German works, besides Adolf Gaspary, are those of Berthold Wiese and Erasmo Percopo (illustrated; Leipzig, 1899), and of Tommaso Casini (in Grober's Grundr. der rom. Phil., Strasbourg, 1896–1899).

English students are referred to John Addington Symonds's Renaissance in Italy (especially, but not exclusively, vols. iv. and v.; new ed., London, 1902), and to Richard Garnett's History of Italian Literature (London, 1898).

A Short History of Italian Literature, by J. H. Whitfield (1969, Pelican Books)

Original texts and criticism
 De Sanctis, F., Storia della letteratura italiana. Napoli, Morano, 1870
 Gardner, E. G., The National Idea in Italian Literature, Manchester, 1921
 Momigliano, A., Storia della letteratura italiana. Messina-Milano, Principato, 1936
 Sapegno, N., Compendio di storia della letteratura italiana. La Nuova Italia, 1936–47
 Croce, B., La letteratura italiana per saggi storicamente disposti. Laterza, 1956–60
 Russo, L., Compendio storico della letteratura italiana. Messina-Firenze, D'Anna, 1961
 Petronio, G., Compendio di storia della letteratura italiana. Palermo, Palumbo, 1968
 Asor Rosa, A., Sintesi di storia della letteratura italiana. Firenze, La Nuova Italia, 1986
 AA.VV., Antologia della poesia italiana, ed. C. Segre and C. Ossola. Torino, Einaudi, 1997
 De Rienzo, Giorgio, Breve storia della letteratura italiana. Milano, Tascabili Bompiani, 2006 [1997], 
 Giudice, A., Bruni, G., Problemi e scrittori della letteratura italiana. Torino, 1973
 Bruni F., Testi e documenti. Torino, UTET, 1984
 Bruni, F. L'Italiano nelle regioni. Torino, UTET, 1997
 Ferroni, G, Storia della letteratura italiana, Milano, Mondadori, 2006

External links
 Liber Liber(progetto Manuzio) Italian literature texts.
 www.StoriaDellaLetteratura.it - Storia della letteratura italiana (history of italian literature, full text, by Antonio Piromalli)
 Original and unabridged italian versions of italian literature
 Original Italian literature academic journal articles